Mouhcine Bouhlal (born 22 April 1970) is a Moroccan former footballer. He competed in the 1992 Summer Olympics.

References

External links
 

1970 births
Living people
Moroccan footballers
Morocco international footballers
Olympic footballers of Morocco
Footballers at the 1992 Summer Olympics
Place of birth missing (living people)
Association football defenders
Mediterranean Games bronze medalists for Morocco
Mediterranean Games medalists in football
Competitors at the 1991 Mediterranean Games
1992 African Cup of Nations players